Short Creek Township is one of the fifteen townships of Harrison County, Ohio, United States. As of the 2010 census the population was 1,090, of whom 732 lived in the unincorporated portion of the township.

Geography
Located in the southeastern corner of the county, it borders the following townships:
Green Township - north
Smithfield Township, Jefferson County - northeast
Mount Pleasant Township, Jefferson County - east
Colerain Township, Belmont County - southeast corner
Wheeling Township, Belmont County - south
Athens Township - southwest
Cadiz Township - northwest

Two incorporated villages are located in Short Creek Township: Adena in the northeast, and Harrisville in the southeast.

Name and history
The township is named for Short Creek, a local tributary of the Ohio River. It is the only Short Creek Township statewide.

Government
The township is governed by a three-member board of trustees, who are elected in November of odd-numbered years to a four-year term beginning on the following January 1. Two are elected in the year after the presidential election and one is elected in the year before it. There is also an elected township fiscal officer, who serves a four-year term beginning on April 1 of the year after the election, which is held in November of the year before the presidential election. Vacancies in the fiscal officership or on the board of trustees are filled by the remaining trustees.

References

External links
County website

Townships in Harrison County, Ohio
Townships in Ohio